Brent Taylor may refer to:

Brent Taylor (politician) (born 1959), Canadian politician
Brent Taylor (activist), member of the Squamish Five
Brent R. Taylor (1979–2018), American politician and Army National Guard officer